Malininsky is a rural locality (a settlement) in Novoalexandrovskoye Rural Settlement, Suzdalsky District, Vladimir Oblast, Russia. The population was 89 as of 2010. There are 2 streets.

Geography 
Malininsky is located 22 km southwest of Suzdal (the district's administrative centre) by road. Stary Dvor is the nearest rural locality.

References 

Rural localities in Suzdalsky District